Matteo di Génnaro (1621–1674) was a Roman Catholic prelate who served as Archbishop of Reggio Calabria (1660–1674).

Biography
Matteo di Génnaro was born in Naples, Italy in 1621.
On 5 April 1660, he was appointed during the papacy of Pope Alexander VII as Archbishop of Reggio Calabria.
On 11 April 1660, he was consecrated bishop by Marcello Santacroce, Bishop of Tivoli, with Giuseppe Ciantes, Bishop Emeritus of Marsico Nuovo, and Giovanni Agostino Marliani, Bishop Emeritus of Accia and Mariana, serving as co-consecrators. 
He served as Archbishop of Reggio Calabria until his death on 21 January 1674.

While bishop, he was the principal co-consecrator of Bonaventura Cavalli, Bishop of Caserta (1668).

References

External links and additional sources
 (for Chronology of Bishops) 
 (for Chronology of Bishops) 

17th-century Roman Catholic archbishops in the Kingdom of Naples
Bishops appointed by Pope Alexander VII
1621 births
1674 deaths